Robert McChesney may refer to:
 Robert D. McChesney (born 1944), scholar on the history of Central Asia, Iran, and Afghanistan
 Robert P. McChesney (1913–2008), California artist
 Robert W. McChesney (born 1952), professor at the University of Illinois at Urbana-Champaign, media critic, founder Free Press and Media Matters radio program host
 Bob McChesney, jazz trombonist
 Bob McChesney (American football, born 1912) (1912–1986), American football player
 Bob McChesney (American football, born 1926) (1926–2002), American football player